Mercer Run is a  long 1st order tributary to North Fork Tomlinson Run in Hancock County, West Virginia.  This is the only stream of this name in the United States.

Course
Mercer Run rises about 4 miles south of Newell, West Virginia, in Hancock County and then flows south to join North Fork Tomlinson Run about 2.5 miles north of New Manchester.

Watershed
Mercer Run drains  of area, receives about 37.9 in/year of precipitation, has a wetness index of 299.58, and is about 63% forested.

See also
List of rivers of West Virginia

References

Rivers of Hancock County, West Virginia
Rivers of West Virginia